The Electoral Registration (Northern Ireland) Act 2005 (c 1) was an Act of the Parliament of the United Kingdom. It expired on 24 February 2006.

Baroness Amos said that the Bill for this Act was introduced because the government was concerned that only 85% of those eligible to vote in Northern Ireland were included in the electoral register (compared to 93% in Great Britain).

Parliamentary debates
The Bill for this Act passed through its stages in the House of Lords on the following dates:

The Bill received its Second and Third Reading in the House of Commons on 24 February 2005.

Restoration to electoral register of names previously removed
This section read:

"the 1983 Act"

This means the Representation of the People Act 1983.

Temporary modifications of s. 10A of Representation of the People Act 1983
This section modified section 10A of the Representation of the People Act 1983.

References
Halsbury's Statutes,

External links
The Electoral Registration (Northern Ireland) Act 2005, as amended from the National Archives.
The Electoral Registration (Northern Ireland) Act 2005, as originally enacted from the National Archives.

United Kingdom Acts of Parliament 2005
Acts of the Parliament of the United Kingdom concerning Northern Ireland
2005 in Northern Ireland